Jules Van Dievoet (7 March 18442 March 1917) was a Belgian jurist and Supreme Court advocate.

He was the son of Augustus Van Dievoet, jurist, lawyer, historian and Latin writer.

Biography 
He married Marguerite Anspach (18 September 185224 December 1934), daughter of Jules Anspach, burgomaster of the City of Brussels.

After studying at the Athénée de Bruxelles and studying at the Faculty of Law of the Free University of Brussels, where he obtained his doctorate in law with distinction in 1865, he was destined for the career of a lawyer.

After an internship at Louis Leclercq, he was sworn in as a lawyer on 18 August 1865. He was appointed barrister at the Court of Cassation by Royal Decree of 31 December 1880, replacing Auguste Orts, who had died.

He was president of the Bar of Cassation from 1900 to 1902.

Honours 

  Knight of the Order of Leopold

See also 
 Van Dievoet family

Bibliography 

 Bart Coppein and Jérôme De Brouwer, Histoire du barreau de Bruxelles / 1811–2011 / Geschiedenis van de balie van Brussel, Brussels, Bruylant, 2012, p. 88.

References

1844 births
1917 deaths
Jurists from Brussels
19th-century Belgian lawyers
Free University of Brussels (1834–1969) alumni
Burials at Brussels Cemetery
Jules
20th-century Belgian lawyers